Angelo J. Morinello is the Assembly member for the 145th District of the New York State Assembly. He is a Republican. The district includes Niagara Falls, North Tonawanda as well as Lewiston in Erie and Niagara counties.

Life and career
Morinello was born and raised in Western New York, and is a veteran of the War in Vietnam. An attorney, Morinello served as the in-house counsel for his family's business, Certo Brothers Distributing Company. He previously served as an assistant Nassau County district attorney, as well as the counsel to Niagara Falls Community Development.

Previously, Morinello served as Niagara Falls City Court judge from 2001 to 2015.

New York State Assembly
In 2016, Assemblyman John Ceretto switched parties, becoming a Democrat after initially being elected as a Republican. Ceretto had previously been a Democrat, but rode the Republican wave into office in 2010, before voting more often with Democrats in his second term. While the district was competitive on paper, it historically had supported Republicans.

Morinello was drafted by Republicans to run against Ceretto in 2016. The campaign was one of the most expensive Assembly races of the cycle. In a good year for Republicans, he defeated Ceretto 55% to 45%.  He was sworn into office on January 1, 2017.

References

External links
New York State Assemblyman Angelo J. Morinello official site

Year of birth missing (living people)
Living people
Republican Party members of the New York State Assembly
Politicians from Niagara Falls, New York
21st-century American politicians